Shane's Rib Shack is an American fast casual BBQ franchise, serving slow-cooked baby back ribs, hand-chopped chicken and pork, and Southern style side dishes.  As of January, 2016, they are located in ten states, with most of their restaurants located in the state of Georgia.

Founders
In 2002, Shane and Stacey Thompson opened the first location in an old roadside shack on Highway 155 in McDonough, Georgia. Shane's grandfather's BBQ sauce recipe was featured from the start. Shane serves as President of the company.

Shacks
The original shack was a tin roof building complete with an outhouse. The second location opened in 2004, in what used to be a small rural family restaurant. The chain has evolved the feel of its early restaurants into a new restaurant image that they call "shabby chic". These new locations are made to resemble a shack, in an upscale way, and began appearing in 2005.

Awards
 20 on Fast Casual Magazines Top 100 Movers and Shakers, 2008
 Fast Casual Magazines Top Movers & Shakers, 2007
 Fast Casual Magazines Top Movers & Shakers, 2005
 Best Barbecue Ribs – Best of the Bay 2008, Pensacola, Florida
 Best Barbecue Overall – Best of the Bay 2008, Pensacola, Florida
 Best Barbecue, 2007 – Gwinnett Magazine

Growth
Shane's Rib Shack became one of the nation's fastest growing fast casual BBQ restaurants in its first five years of business, as it grew from two locations in 2004 to 85 locations in 2008.

Locations
As of January 2016, Shane's Rib Shack has a total of 74 locations, in Alabama, Arizona, Florida, Georgia, Louisiana, New York, North Carolina, South Carolina, Tennessee, and Virginia. There are no locations outside of the United States.

National promotions
 2007: Introduced party platters of baby back ribs, chicken wings, or chicken tenders for tailgating and football-watching parties.
 2008: Celebrated BBQ month by offering free ribs to the first 100 customers at each location on May 17, 2008.
 2008: Offered free chicken tender meals on Election Day 2008.

See also
 List of barbecue restaurants

References

Barbecue restaurants in the United States
Restaurants in Georgia (U.S. state)
Restaurants in Atlanta
Restaurants established in 2002
2002 establishments in Georgia (U.S. state)
American companies established in 2002